Honningcentralen AL is a Norwegian processor and distributor of honey with two processing plants, at Kløfta and Grimstad. It is organised as an agricultural cooperative with 1,650 members. In addition to Norwegian honey, it also imports Croatian and Argentine honey.

History
The cooperative was founded on 28 November 1927, but until World War II there was not a good market for retailing honey. After the war sugar was rationed and honey became an important substitute. The most important aspect was to cover medical needs, and hospitals, orphanages and pharmacies were prioritised. The rest was distributed out between the wholesalers. The rationing was removed in 1952. The plant in Grimstad opened in the 1970s and in 2005 the headquarters moved from Oslo to Kløfta.

References

Companies based in Akershus
Agricultural cooperatives in Norway
Food and drink companies established in 1927
Ullensaker
1927 establishments in Norway
Honey